The Nautilus was a magazine of the New Thought Movement, founded in 1898 by Elizabeth Towne, in Portland, Oregon. The magazine was briefly published in Sioux Falls, South Dakota in 1899; however, in May 1900, Towne moved to Holyoke, Massachusetts, which became the magazine's permanent home until its discontinuation in August 1953, when Towne retired from publishing at the age of 88. Towne also published, under the "Elizabeth Towne" imprint, books consisting of material which had run in serialized form in the magazine, generally supplying introductions to the compiled works.  
Authors who were published in the magazine include:

 William Walker Atkinson
 Kate Atkinson Boehme
 Jonathan Balcombe
 Florence Tabor Critchlow
 Paul Ellsworth
 Orison Swett Marden
 Edwin Markham
 Thomas J. Shelton
 Elizabeth Towne
 William Towne
 Wallace Wattles

During the 1912 campaign of Theodore Roosevelt, Elizabeth and her husband William were active in the national delegations of the Progressive Party, and published coverage of the movement's conventions in Chicago and Boston that year.

References

External sources
 Elizabeth Towne Home Page
 Nautilus archives, The International Association for the Preservation of Spiritualism and Occult Periodicals (IAPSOP)

1898 establishments in Oregon
1953 disestablishments in Massachusetts
Monthly magazines published in the United States
Religious magazines published in the United States
Defunct magazines published in the United States
Magazines established in 1898
Magazines disestablished in 1953
Magazines published in Massachusetts
Magazines published in Portland, Oregon
Magazines published in South Dakota
Mass media in Holyoke, Massachusetts
Mass media in Sioux Falls, South Dakota
New Thought magazines